Mesua ferrea, the Ceylon ironwood,  or cobra saffron, is a species in the family Calophyllaceae. This slow-growing tree is named after the heaviness and hardness of its timber. It is widely cultivated as an ornamental due to its graceful shape, grayish-green foliage with a beautiful pink to red flush of drooping young leaves, and large, fragrant white flowers. 
It is native to wet, tropical parts of Sri Lanka, India, southern Nepal, Burma, Thailand, Indochina, the Philippines, Malaysia and Sumatra, where it grows in evergreen forests, especially in river valleys. It is national tree of Sri Lanka, state tree of Mizoram and state flower of Tripura.

Description

The bark of younger trees has an ash grey color with flaky peelings, while of old trees the bark is dark ash-grey with a red-brown blaze. The emerging young leaves are red to yellowish pink and drooping. The branches are slender, terete and glabrous. The fruit is an ovoid to globose capsule with one to two seeds.

History of the tree in Sri Lanka
In the dry zone of Sri Lanka, where ironwood trees normally do not grow wild, large, old ironwood trees can be seen around the remains of ancient Buddhist monasteries on rocky hills around Dambulla such as Na Uyana Aranya, Namal Uyana, Na-golla Aranya, Pidurangala near Sigiriya, Kaludiya Pokuna near Kandalama, and Ritigala. They are probably the descendants of trees planted as ornamentals in the monasteries in ancient times during the Anuradhapura period. Older trees form suckers or shoots from the base of the trunk, which become new trees when the old trunk falls down; therefore the bases and roots of some ironwood trees in these sites might be very old.

In Theravada Buddhism, this tree is said to have used as the tree for achieved enlightenment, or Bodhi by four Buddhas called "Mangala - මංගල", "Sumana - සුමන", "Revatha - රේවත", and "Sobhitha - සෝභිත".

This is probably the tree mentioned by Joanna Baillie in her play The Bride: 'Of the strong Nahagaha pride of the wood', the name Nahagaha being translated as 'the iron tree'. This play is set in Ceylon (Sri Lanka).

Uses
As the English name indicates, the wood of this tree is very heavy, hard and strong. The density is 940 to 1,195 kg/m3 (59 to 75 lb/ft3) at 15% moisture content. The colour is deep dark red. It is hard to saw and is mainly used for railroad ties and heavy structural timber.

In Sri Lanka the pillars of the 14th century Embekke Shrine near Kandy are made of iron tree wood.

The flowers, leaves, seeds and roots are used as herbal medicines in India, Malaysia, etc. and in Nag Champa incense sticks.

In eastern state of Assam, India, its seeds were also used for lighting purpose in evening for day to day purpose (while mustard oil for religious and health and culinary purposes) before the introduction of kerosene by the British.

Taxonomical status
Mesua ferrea is a complex species and has recently been split into several species and varieties. A.J.G.H. Kostermans and Gunatilleke et al. call the tree described in this article Mesua nagassarium. Kostermans lists several subspecies of Mesua nagassarium.

These authors list Mesua ferrea as a separate species that is endemic to Sri Lanka and is a small, 15 meters high tree that grows near streams and in marshes in the Southwest of Sri Lanka, where it is called "Diya Na" in Sinhala, meaning "Water Na Tree". This "Diya Na" is not cultivated. Gunatilleke et al. (p. 139), however, remark in a footnote: "In the most recent revision diya na is named as Mesua thwaitesii and na as Mesua ferrea".

Kostermans and Gunatilleke et al. classify Mesua ferrea in the family Clusiaceae, while in the AgroForestryTree Database it is allocated to the Guttiferae.

Gallery

See also
 List of Indian timber trees
Nagkesar seed oil

References

External links

 Contains a detailed monograph on Mesua ferrea (Nagakeshara) as well as a discussion of health benefits and usage in clinical practice. Available online at https://web.archive.org/web/20101229121750/http://www.toddcaldecott.com/index.php/herbs/learning-herbs/312-nagakeshara
Sriracha College: Mesua ferrea(in Thai; numerous photos)

ferrea
Flora of tropical Asia
National symbols of Sri Lanka
Symbols of Mizoram
Symbols of Tripura
Plants described in 1753
Taxa named by Carl Linnaeus